Carmelo Micciche (born 16 August 1963 in Uckange, Moselle) is a French former football striker.

Club career
Born in Lorraine from Sicilian parents, he played for local clubs FC Metz and AS Nancy

References

External links
 Profile
 Stats

1963 births
Living people
Sportspeople from Moselle (department)
Association football forwards
French footballers
French expatriate footballers
France international footballers
Ligue 1 players
FC Metz players
Olympique de Marseille players
AS Cannes players
AS Nancy Lorraine players
Liga Leumit players
Hapoel Petah Tikva F.C. players
Expatriate footballers in Israel
French expatriate sportspeople in Israel
Expatriate footballers in Luxembourg
French expatriate sportspeople in Luxembourg
French football managers
Footballers from Grand Est
French people of Sicilian descent